GMCH may refer to:
 GMCH Chandigarh, a government teaching hospital in Chandigarh], India
 Gauhati Medical College and Hospital, Assam
 General Motors Components Holdings - Holding company of GM for components businesses, some which were re-acquired from Delphi Corporation
 Northbridge (computing) - Integrated video controllers also known as Graphics and Memory Controller Hub.